Oxford United Football Club is an English professional association football club based in Oxford. As of the 2022–23 season, the team plays in the League One, which is the third level of the English football league system. The club was formed in 1893 as Headington before adding the suffix United six years later to become Headington United F.C. The club retained this name until 1960, when it was changed to Oxford United to give it a higher profile. The club was elected into the Southern Football League in 1949, where they stayed until replacing Accrington Stanley in the Football League in 1962. The club spent 44 years in the Football League, reaching the First Division at the end of the 1984–85 season and spending three years in the top tier. Oxford United spent four years in non-league football, before being promoted through the play-offs at the end of the 2009–10 season.

Ron Atkinson made 560 appearances, including 125 matches in the Southern League (a semi-professional league). John Shuker, the man who succeeded Atkinson as captain, made a total of 534 appearances with 478 in the Football League. He holds the club record for the most league appearances and the most overall appearances since 1962, when Oxford joined the Football League. Graham Atkinson holds the record for league goals scored with 97, as well as being the all-time top goalscorer, netting 107 times. Irish forward John Aldridge holds two records, the first being the most league goals scored in a season with 30, and the second the most goals scored in a season with 34. Both of these were set during the 1984–85 season, the year Oxford was promoted to the First Division. David Sloan made his international debut in 1968 for Northern Ireland, becoming the first of twenty players to receive an international cap while playing for the club. Of the players in this list, 119 are from the United Kingdom, five from Ireland, and five are from the rest of the world.

List of players
The list comprises players with 100 or more appearances and those who have received international caps while at the club or hold a club record, since 1949 when the club turned professional. Appearances and goals are for matches in the Football League, Conference National, Southern League, FA Cup, Football League Cup, Football League Trophy, Football League Group Cup, Anglo-Italian Cup, Full Members' Cup, FA Trophy and Southern League Cup. Substitute appearances are included. Statistics correct as of 21 March 2021.  Players marked in bold are still playing for the club.

Footnotes
A.  For a full description of positions see Association football positions.

B.  The dates for the career represent the first and last first team appearances. When there are two sets of dates, the second set represents a player's second spell at the club.

C.  Unless otherwise stated, appearances and goals taken from 

D.  Statistics taken from 

E.  John Aldridge holds the club record for the most league goals scored in a season with 30, and the most goals scored in a season, 34, during the 1984–85 season.

F.  Graham Atkinson holds the club record for the most goals scored with 107.

G.  Graham Atkinson holds the club record for the most league goals scored with 97.

H.  Ron Atkinson holds the club record for the most overall appearances in all competitions (including matches in the Southern League) with 560.

I.  Matt Elliott holds the club record for the highest transfer fee received of £1,600,000 from Leicester City in 1997.

J.  John Shuker holds the club record for the most league appearances, with 478, and the most overall appearances (excluding matches in the Southern League), with 534.

K.  David Sloan was the first Oxford United player to play a full international, for Northern Ireland in 1968.

L.  Dean Windass holds the club record for the highest transfer fee paid of £470,000 to Aberdeen in 1998.

M.  Soccerbase does not include the three FA Trophy appearances.

References
General
 
 

Specific

 
Oxford United F.C.
Oxford-related lists
Association football player non-biographical articles